Sycamore Hills is a village in St. Louis County, Missouri, United States. The population is 560 at the 2020 census.

Geography
Sycamore Hills is located at  (38.701051, -90.348916).

Demographics

2020 census
As of the 2020 census, there were 560 people and 291 households living in the city. The racial makeup of the village was 71.4% White (70.4% non-Hispanic White), 18.6% African American, 0.6% Asian, 0.9% from other races, and 8.2% from two or more races. Hispanic or Latino of any race were 5.2% of the population.

2010 census
As of the census of 2012, there were 827 people, 293 households, and 171 families living in the village. The racial makeup of the village was 82.8% White, 12.3% African American, 0.7% Asian, 0.7% from other races, and 3.4% from two or more races. Hispanic or Latino of any race were 4.3% of the population.

There were 293 households, of which 28.4% had children under the age of 18 living with them, 44.3% were married couples living together, 12.1% had a female householder with no husband present, 2.8% had a male householder with no wife present, and 40.8% were non-families. 30.5% of all households were made up of individuals, and 11.7% had someone living alone who was 65 years of age or older. The average household size was 2.37 and the average family size was 3.00.

The median age in the village was 40.9 years. 20.5% of residents were under the age of 18; 7.3% were between the ages of 18 and 24; 27.6% were from 25 to 44; 30.5% were from 45 to 64; and 14.1% were 65 years of age or older. The gender makeup of the village was 48.5% male and 51.5% female.

2000 census
As of the census of 2000, there were 722 people, 289 households, and 180 families living in the village. The racial makeup of the village was 90.72% White, 6.93% African American, 0.42% Native American, 0.42% from other races, and 1.52% from two or more races. Hispanic or Latino of any race were 0.42% of the population.

There were 289 households, out of which 32.2% had children under the age of 18 living with them, 49.1% were married couples living together, 10.4% had a female householder with no husband present, and 37.7% were non-families. 32.2% of all households were made up of individuals, and 10.7% had someone living alone who was 65 years of age or older. The average household size was 2.50 and the average family size was 3.22.

In the village, the population was spread out, with 27.6% under the age of 18, 6.1% from 18 to 24, 33.7% from 25 to 44, 19.8% from 45 to 64, and 12.9% who were 65 years of age or older. The median age was 37 years. For every 100 females, there were 96.7 males. For every 100 females age 18 and over, there were 90.9 males.

The median income for a household in the village was $41,146, and the median income for a family was $45,893. Males had a median income of $36,518 versus $26,016 for females. The per capita income for the village was $18,761. About 2.2% of families and 2.4% of the population were below the poverty line, including 4.4% of those under age 18 and 4.8% of those age 65 or over.

Community
Sycamore Hills was incorporated as a village on November 3, 1941. In October, 1920, Charles A. Lindbergh took several aerial photos of the area.

The village is primarily a residential community, currently with no business establishments. Nearly all of the houses are of brick and masonry construction, 1 to 2 stories, and have three or more bedrooms. Most of the homes were built between 1925 and 1950. They range architecturally from American traditional bungalow to Tudor Revival style, with very little repetition in design. As of January 2011 there were two vacant residential building lots in the village.

Until the early 1970s, Sycamore Hills included several retail businesses. Currently, the only non-residential entity in the village is Calvary United Church of Christ.

Village business is conducted by an elected board of trustees. Police service is contracted through neighboring St. John Police Department. The trustees meet monthly, and meetings are open to all residents.

Sycamore Hills is bounded on the south by Midland Boulevard (with the exception of the extreme southwest corner, which extends one block further south to Lackland Road). The northern boundary is Graceland Avenue (except for the extreme northwest, which is a short spur off Gothland Avenue extending past Graceland). The north–south streets are Gothland Avenue, Brown Road, Hartland Avenue, Northland Avenue, Ashland Avenue, Oakland Avenue and Walton Road. These cover one city block except for Brown Road, which covers two blocks of the village limits. Northland Avenue is a limited-access street, and Sycamore Court, at the southwest corner of the village, is a cul-de-sac.

The southeast village limit is immediately adjacent to the site of the historic Overland Park, where the Overland Trail began.

References

External links
 Village of Sycamore Hills official website

Villages in St. Louis County, Missouri
Villages in Missouri